The Theatines, officially named the Congregation of Clerics Regular (abbreviated CR), is a Catholic order of clerics regular of pontifical right for men founded by Archbishop Gian Pietro Carafa on 14 September 1524.

Foundation
The order was founded by Saint Cajetan (Gaetano dei Conti di Thiene), Paolo Consiglieri, Bonifacio da Colle, and Giovanni Pietro Carafa (afterwards Pope Paul IV). Carafa was Bishop of Chieti; Chieti (Theate) is a city of the Abruzzi in Central Italy, from which the congregation adopted its specific name, to distinguish it from other congregations (Barnabites, Somaschi, Caracciolini, etc.) modelled upon it. The Theatines combined the pursuit of evangelical perfection traditional among religious orders with apostolic service generally expected of diocesan clergy. It was Caraffa who wrote the constitutions of the order.

Cajetan consecrated his order to the Cross, which he adopted as its emblem, and the foundation took place on the feast of the Finding of the Holy Cross, May 3, 1524. It was approved on June 24 of that year, by Pope Clement VII in the Brief Exponi Nobis. On September 14, feast of the Exaltation of the Holy Cross, Cajetan and his companions made solemn profession before the papal altar of St. Peter's Basilica in Rome, in the presence of Mgr. Giovanni Battista Bonziano, Bishop of Caserta, a special papal delegate. Caraffa was chosen the first General.

The chief object of the order was to recall the clergy to an edifying life and the laity to the practice of virtue.  They founded oratories (among them the celebrated Divino Amore) and hospitals, devoted themselves to preaching the Gospel, and reformed lax morals. They were exclusive, aristocratic, and formidably austere. They wore the simple black cassock of the local clergy and maintained a modest lifestyle.

Growth

The prohibition on both owning property and soliciting alms tended to limit applicants from members of the aristocracy, and so they remained relatively few in number. In 1546 they were briefly joined with the Somaschi Fathers, but as the object of the respective orders differed, they separated in 1555. In 1527 their house in Rome was sacked by the army of Charles V, and the Roman community sought refuge in Venice.

They founded many beautiful churches, among them the Sant'Andrea della Valle in Rome, a gift of Costanza Piccolomini D'Aragona, Duchess of Amalfi. This church is a masterpiece of Carlo Maderno and contains several paintings by Domenichino. The Theatines still operate the church.

In France, through the efforts of Cardinal Mazarin, they built the Church of St. Anne la Royale opposite the Louvre in 1644. In Spain, under Philip II, the Theatine Cardinal Paolo Burali d'Arezzo, filled various embassies at the command of the viceroy of Naples. In Portugal, John IV, in 1648, gave the Theatines a splendid house and college for the education of noble youth. In England, under Henry VIII, Thomas Goldwell, Bishop of St. Asaph, entered the order of Theatines. In Bavaria, the Theatine Church St. Kajetan was built from 1663 to 1690, founded by Elector Ferdinand Maria.

The Theatines were the first to found papal missions in: Golconda (in present-day India), Ava (Burma), Peru, Mingrelia (Georgia), founded by Andrea Borromeo, the East Indies, (the history of which was written by the Theatine Bartolomeo Ferro - "Missioni Teatine nelle Indie Orientali"), Arabia, and Armenia. In 1626 Theatines went to Persia.

Theatine manuscripts dating from 1530 until the end of the 18th century show there were missions established in a number of other countries also. By 1700 the Theatines numbered 1400.

Decline of the Order
By the end of the eighteenth century, decline had set in, exacerbated by political upheavals. General suppression of religious orders affected the Theatines more significantly because the order historically acquired no possessions and so had no institutional infrastructure.

Pope Pius X had a hand in attempts at revival, calling upon the services of Cardinal José de Calasanz Félix Santiago Vives y Tutó. The papal Motu Proprio Auspicato, of December 15, 1909, decreed the union of the Congregation of the Regular Theatine Clergy with the youthful Spanish Congregation of the Holy Family founded at Barcelona by Josep Manyanet y Vives, but the two groups were separated again in 1916. In 1910, the Theatines were amalgamated with the Congregation of Saint Alphonsus Liguori, which had been founded in Mallorca in 1867.

Today
According to the Annuario Pontificio, as of 31 December 2014, the Theatines had 34 houses and numbered 170 members, of whom 139 were priests. The Theatines are present in Argentina, Brazil, Colombia, Mexico, the Netherlands, Spain, and the United States of America, where they maintain a mission at Durango, Colorado.

Prominent members

The Order has numbered among its members
 Saint Cajetan
 Saint Andrea Avellino
 Saint Giuseppe Maria Tomasi 
 Blessed Giovanni Marinoni
 Blessed Paolo Burali d'Arezzo.
 
It has also furnished one pope, Paul IV (Giovanni Pietro Carafa), 250 bishops, archbishops, and papal legates, and several cardinals.

Among noted nineteenth-century Theatines was the Sicilian Father Gioacchino Ventura dei baroni di Raulica,  a philosopher, littérateur, and orator. One of his most celebrated works being his funeral oration on the death of Daniel O'Connell. The astronomer Giuseppe Piazzi (1746-1826), professor of mathematics and astronomy in Palermo, Sicily, discoverer of the first asteroid, Ceres, in 1801, became a Theatine at the age of 19.

See also
 Blue Scapular of the Immaculate Conception

Notes

Bibliography
 Bartolommeo Ferro, Istoria delle missioni de chierici regolari teatini 2 vols. (Roma 1705).
 Domenico Sangiacomo, Cenno storico sulla fondazione dell'ordine de' cc. rr. Teatini scritto in occasione di celebrarsi nella chiesa di S. Paolo di Napoli il terzo centenario dalla fondazione medesima (Napoli 1824).
 Gaetano Magenis, Vita di s. Gaetano Tiene fondatore de' chierici regolari e patriarca di tutto il regolare chiericato (Napoli 1845).
 Giuseppe Maria Ginelli, Memorie istoriche della vita di S. Gaetano Tiene, fondatore e patriarca de' Cherici (Venezia 1753).
 Herbert Vaughan, The Life of St. Cajetan: Count of Tiene, Founder of the Theatines (London : T. Richardson, 1888).
 Paul A. Kunkel,  The Theatines in the History of Catholic Reform Before the Establishment of Lutheranism  (Washington DC 1941).

External links
Theatines U.S. Province
Theatines Mexican Province (in Spanish)
Theatines Italian Province (in Italian)

 
1524 establishments in Italy
Theatine bishops